Stigmella platina is a species of moth in the family Nepticulidae. It is endemic to New Zealand.

The length of the forewings is about 3 mm.

The larvae probably feed on Brachyglottis eleagnifοlius, as adults have been swept from this shrub.

References

External links
Fauna of New Zealand - Number 16: Nepticulidae (Insecta: Lepidoptera)

Nepticulidae
Moths of New Zealand
Endemic fauna of New Zealand
Moths described in 1989
Endemic moths of New Zealand